A dragon is a legendary creature, typically with reptile-like traits.

Dragon may also refer to:

Places

Extra-terrestrial
 Draco (constellation) (Latin for Dragon), a constellation in the far northern sky
 The Dragon, a grouping of galaxies in the field of Abell 370

Terrestrial
 Dragon, Utah, United States, a ghost town
 Dragon Cone, a volcano in British Columbia, Canada
 Dragon Hill, Uffington, a mountain in England
 "The Dragon", a section of U.S. Route 129 between Deals Gap, North Carolina and Punkin Center, Tennessee, in the United States

People
 Vlad II Dracul (1390–1447), duke of Wallachia, nicknamed "Vlad the Dragon"
 Goran Dragić (born 1986), Slovenian basketball player
 G-Dragon (born 1988), South Korean rapper
 Carmen Dragon (1914–1984), American conductor and composer
 Daryl Dragon (1942–2019), American musician, one half of the duo Captain & Tennille; son of Carmen Dragon
 Tatsumi Fujinami (born 1953), Japanese professional wrestler, nicknamed "The Dragon"
 Bruce Lee (1940–1973), Chinese actor and martial artist, nicknamed "The Dragon"
 Lyoto Machida (born 1978), Brazilian martial artist, nicknamed "The Dragon"
 Ricky Steamboat (born 1953), American professional wrestler, nicknamed "The Dragon"
 Matthew Stevens, Welsh snooker player nicknamed "The Welsh Dragon"
 Don "The Dragon" Wilson (born 1954), American champion kickboxer and actor
 Ryuji Kumita (born 1967), Japanese racing driver who uses the pseudonym "Dragon"

Arts and entertainment

Characters and fictional entities
 Dragon (Dungeons & Dragons), a monstrous creature
 Dragon (Middle-earth), a type of fictional character in J. R. R. Tolkien's books
 Dragon (Shrek), a character in Shrek
 The Dragon, a title for the world's champion against the forces of darkness in Robert Jordan's Wheel of Time series, held at different times in the series continuity by the characters Lews Telamon and Rand al'Thor
 Dragon, a member of Gen13
 Dragon, the leading character in the Image Comics title Savage Dragon
 Dragons (Dragon Prince), mythical beasts
 Dragons (Pern), by Anne McCaffrey
 The Dragon (Beowulf)
 Richard Dragon, a DC Comics character
 Dragon Shiryū, a Saint Seiya character
 Dragon (One Piece)

Films
 The Dragon (1916 film), directed by Harry A. Pollard
 Dragon (2006 film), an action/fantasy film
 Dragon (2011 film), a Hong Kong-Chinese martial arts thriller
 Dragon: The Bruce Lee Story, a 1993 biographical film
 Dragons 3D, a 2013 IMAX film starring Max von Sydow
 Dragons: Fire and Ice (2004 film), animated Mega-Blocks film

Gaming
 Dragon, a version of the video game Mega Man Star Force
 Dragon tiles, a type of honor tile in mahjong
 Sicilian Defence, Dragon Variation, a chess opening
 Dragon by Komodo Chess, a chess engine

Literature
 Dragon (Brust novel), a 1998 novel by Steven Brust
 Dragon (Cussler novel), a 1990 novel by Clive Cussler 
 Dragon (fantasy series), fantasy novels by Laurence Yep (1982–1992)
 "Dragon" (Kalapugama short story), by Anandasiri Kalapugama (1975)
 Dragon (poem), by Aleksey Tolstoy (1875)
 "The Dragon" (poem), by Abd al-Wahhab Al-Bayyati (1996)
 "Dragon: the Old Potter's Tale", a short story by Ryūnosuke Akutagawa (1919)
 The Dragon (fairy tale), an Italian fairy tale
 "The Dragon" (short story), by Ray Bradbury (1955)
 The Dragons, a 1996 fantasy novel by Douglas Niles

Periodicals
 Dragon (magazine), a Dungeons & Dragons magazine
 Dragon Magazine (Fujimi Shobo), a Japanese light novel magazine (1988-current)

Music

Bands
 Imagine Dragons, an American pop rock band

Groups
 Dragon (band), a New Zealand/Australian rock group
 Dragons (band), an English group
 The Dragons (band), an American rock group
 Imagine Dragons, an American pop rock band

Albums
 Dragon (Loudness album)
 Dragon (Jake Shimabukuro album)
 The Dragon (album), by Vangelis

Songs
 "Dragon", by Martin Garrix
 "Dragon", by Miriam Bryant
 "Dragon", by the Sugarcubes from Life's Too Good
 "Dragons", by Caravan Palace from Caravan Palace

Roller coasters
 Dragon (Adventureland), in Altoona, Iowa 
 Dragon Challenge, in Orlando, Florida
 Dragon Coaster (Playland), in Rye, New York
 The Dragon, Ocean Park Hong Kong, in Hong Kong, China

Television
 Dragon Television, a Chinese provincial satellite TV station
 Dragon (TV series), a Canadian children's TV program
 DreamWorks Dragons, a TV series based on How to Train Your Dragon
 "The Dragon" (Arrow), nineteenth episode of the 2018 sixth season of the TV show Arrow

Other arts and entertainment
 Dragon (M. C. Escher), a 1952 wood-engraving print by M. C. Escher
 The Dragon (theatre play), by Evgeny Shvarts (1944)
 Oliver Emanuel#Dragon, a 2013 play written by Oliver Emanuel

Biology
 DRAGON (protein), a membrane receptor protein
 Draco volans, commonly known as the flying dragon, a species of lizard endemic to Southeast Asia
 Komodo dragon, a large species of lizard found in the Indonesian islands of Komodo 
 Pogona, a genus of Australian lizards commonly called "bearded dragons"
 Many species of the lizard genus Ctenophorus
 Tarragon which is called dragon in several languages including its Latin name

Brands and enterprises
 Cathay Dragon, an international airline based in Hong Kong, previously known as Dragonair
 Dragon Models Limited, a toy manufacturer
 Dragon Petroleum, a Welsh fuel company

Education
 Dragon School, a British preparatory school in Oxford, England
 The Dragon Academy, a private school in Ontario, Canada

Mathematics and computing
 Dragon (cipher)
 Dragon (remote sensing)
 AMD Dragon, a platform engineered for gamers
 Comodo Dragon, a freeware web browser
 Dragon chip, a line of Chinese CPUs
 Dragon curve, a family of fractal curves
 Dragon Data, a Welsh computer manufacturer
 Dragon 32/64, the names of two 1980s home computers
 Dragon NaturallySpeaking, a speech recognition software package
 DRAKON (Russian: ДРАКОН, "dragon"), a programming language used in flight controllers for rockets and space vehicles

Military
 Dragon (firearm), the short version of the blunderbuss
 "Dragons", a USMC helicopter squadron (see: VMM-265)
 BQM-147 Dragon, United States unmanned aerial vehicle
 Focke-Achgelis Fa 223, German World War II helicopter, known in English as Dragon
 HMS Dragon, the name of at least 14 ships (and a building) of the English/British Navy
 M47 Dragon, an American anti-tank missile system
 The Dragons, a display team consisting of 4 x Hawker Hunters of No. 4 Flying Training School RAF, during 1973
 , a Union Navy steamer during the American Civil War
 Dragón, a Spanish development of the Mowag Piranha V Wheeled Infantry Fighting Vehicle

Nobility and royalty
 Dragon Throne, the throne of the Emperor of China
 Order of the Dragon, a former monarchical chivalric order

Sports teams

Africa
 AS Dragons, a soccer team in the Democratic Republic of the Congo
 AS Dragons FC de l'Ouémé, a soccer team in Benin
 Dragón FC, a soccer team in Equatorial Guinea
 Drakensberg Dragons, South Africa field hockey club

Asia
 CEC Dragons, the sports teams of the Cebu Eastern College in the Philippines
 China Dragon, an ice hockey team in China
 Chunichi Dragons, a baseball team in Japan
 Jeonnam Dragons (formerly spelled as Chunnam Dragons), a football team in South Korea
 Jiangsu Dragons, a Chinese Basketball Association team
 Kuala Lumpur Dragons, a Malaysian basketball team
 Shanghai Dragons, an Overwatch eSports team in China
 Sichuan Dragons, a baseball team in China
 Team Dragon, nickname for China men's national basketball team
 Welcoat Dragons, a basketball team in the Philippines

Europe
 AS Dragon (Guadeloupe), an association football team
 Barcelona Dragons (NFL Europe), an American football team active in Spain from 1991 to 2003
 Barcelona Dragons (ELF), an American football team active in Spain since 2021
 Catalans Dragons, a rugby league club in France
 Celtic Dragons, a netball team in Wales, U.K.
 Delft Dragons, an American football team in the Netherlands
 Dragons (rugby union), a rugby union team in South East Wales, U.K.
 Dragons de Rouen, an ice hockey team in France
 Dragons Rhöndorf, a German basketball team
 Dragons (women's cricket), a women's cricket team in Ireland
 Dublin Dragons, an American football team in Ireland
 Dudelange Dragons, an American football team in Luxembourg
 Glamorgan Dragons, a cricket team in the United Kingdom
 KHC Dragons, a field hockey club in Belgium
 RC Dragon Brno, a rugby union team in the Czech Republic
 Wrexham A.F.C., a Welsh association football team known as the Red Dragons

North America
 C.D. Dragón, a soccer team in El Salvador
 Chesapeake Dragons, a soccer team in the U.S.
 Dayton Dragons, a baseball team in the U.S.
 Dragon Racing, an American auto racing team
 Dragons, nickname of sports teams at Jefferson High School in Jefferson, Georgia in the U.S.
 Dragons, nickname of sports teams at Lake Orion High School in Lake Orion, Michigan in the U.S.
 Drexel Dragons, the sports teams of Drexel University in the U.S.
 Jersey Dragons, a soccer team in the U.S.
 Lane College Dragons, the sports teams of Lane College in the U.S.
 Los Angeles Dragons (American football), a former American football team in the U.S.
 Los Angeles Dragons, an Australian rules football team in the U.S.
 Moorhead Dragons, the sports teams of Minnesota State University Moorhead in the U.S.
 New York Dragons, an Arena Football League team in the U.S.
 Portland Forest Dragons, a former name of the Oklahoma Wranglers, an Arena Football team in the U.S.
 San Antonio Dragons, an ice hockey team in the U.S.
 San Francisco Dragons, a field lacrosse team in the U.S.
 Seattle Dragons, an American football team in the U.S.
 Shreveport Swamp Dragons, formerly the Shreveport Captains, a baseball team in the U.S.
 Thomasville Dragons, a women's soccer team in the U.S.
 Tiffin Dragons, the sports teams at Tiffin University in the U.S.
 Verdun Dragons, an ice hockey team in Canada
 Wisconsin Dragons, a women's tackle football team in the U.S.

Oceania
 A.S. Dragon (Tahiti), a soccer team
 Darwin Dragons SC, a soccer team
 Engadine Dragons, a junior rugby league team
 Northcote Football Club, aka the Northcote Dragons, an Australian rules Football team
 St. George Dragons, a rugby league team
 St. George Illawarra Dragons, a rugby league football club
 Shellharbour City Dragons, a rugby league team
 South Dragons, a former team in the Australasian National Basketball League (2006-2009)

Transport

Air
 de Havilland Dragon, a small commercial aircraft
 Douglas B-23 Dragon, a twin-engined bomber aircraft
 Independence Dragon, a German paraglider design
 Sopwith Dragon, a British single-seat fighter biplane

Land
 Dennis Dragon, a bus
 Dragon Automobile Company, an American manufacturer (1906-1908)
 Kaiser Dragon, a 1950s American car
 Dragon (1848–1872), a GWR Iron Duke Class locomotive
 Dragon (1873–1892), a South Devon Railway Buffalo class locomotive
 Dragon (1880–1892), a GWR Rover class locomotive
 Dragon (1891-1915), a GWR 3031 Class locomotive
 Dragon (2009–present) Newag E6ACT, an electric freight locomotive

Space
 Dragon (rocket), a French research sounding rocket
 SpaceX Dragon capsule, used to transport cargo to and from the International Space Station
 SpaceX Dragon 2 capsule, also used to transport crew to and from the International Space Station

Water
 Dragon (keelboat), a sailing yacht, used in racing
 Dragon boat, a narrow canoe-style boat, used for the sport of dragon boat racing

Other uses
 Dragon (Ninurta), a figure in Sumerian religion
 Dragon (zodiac), in the Chinese zodiac
 Dragon reactor, a gas-cooled nuclear reactor in England
 Satan, referred to several times in the Book of Revelation as the "Dragon"
 Welsh Dragon, the flag of Wales
 In the Japanese board game shogi, the rook and bishop promote to a "dragon (king)" and a "dragon horse"
 The 2020 Middle East storms of 23 March 2020 and following days are sometimes called the "Dragon storms"

See also

 
 
 
 Draconian (disambiguation)
 Dracaena (disambiguation)
 Drache (disambiguation)
 Draco (disambiguation)
 Dragone (disambiguation)
 Dragon I (disambiguation)
 Dragon II (disambiguation)
 Red Dragon (disambiguation)